Miss Rwanda 2015, the fifth edition of the Miss Rwanda pageant, was held on 22 February  2015 at Kigali Serena Hotel in the province of Kigali.

The winner, Doriane Kundwa succeeded Colombe Akiwacu, Miss Rwanda 2014. 

Joannah Keza Bagwire, has finished 4th runner-up at Miss Heritage Global 2015.

Results

Special Awards 
Miss Congeniality - Joannah Keza Bagwire (Southern Province) 
Miss Photogenic - Sabrina Kalisi Ihozo (Western Province)
Miss Popularity - Doriane Kundwa (Northern Province)
Miss Heritage - Darlene Gasana (Western Province)

Contestants

Judges 
Cynthia Akazuba - Miss Kigali 2007 and Miss East Africa 2009
Intore Massamba - Singer and musician
John Bunyeshuli - Founder of Kigali Fashion Week
Blanche Majoro - Fashion critic

Crossovers 
Contestants who previously competed at other national beauty pageants:

Miss Rwanda
2014 : Western Province: Vanessa Mpogazi
2016 : Western Province: Vanessa Mpogazi (2nd Runner-up)

Contestants who previously competed or will be competing at international beauty pageants:

Miss Heritage Global 
2015: Southern Province: Joannah Keza Bagwire (4th Runner-up)

References

External links
Official website

2015
2015 in Rwanda
2015 beauty pageants